Ben Wainwright may refer to:

Ben Wainwright, character in The Accused (1988 film)
Ben Wainwright, character in Feast of July
Ben Wainwright (snowboarder) in FIS Snowboard World Cup